Paayum Puli is a 1983 Tamil-language martial arts film directed by S. P. Muthuraman and written by Panchu Arunachalam. Produced by AVM Productions, the film stars Rajinikanth and Radha. Inspired by The 36th Chamber of Shaolin (1978), it revolves around a meek man who learns martial arts to seek revenge for the murder of his sister.

Paayum Puli was released on 14 January 1983, Pongal day. The film became a commercial success and completed a 133-day run at the box office. It was one of the highest-grossing films that year.

Plot 

When a smuggler kills his sister, Bharani, a meek man vows to deliver justice for her death and joins a martial arts school. He trains hard there to become a master fighter, honing his fighting skills. Taking on a new identity, Paayum Puli (Pouncing Tiger), he sets off for revenge, but the affection of a beautiful woman Revathy soon puts a hitch in his plans.

Cast 

Rajinikanth as Bharani (Paayum Puli)
Radha as Revathy
Jaishankar as Ranjith
K. Balaji as master of martial arts (guest appearance)
R. N. Sudarshan as Balram
V. K. Ramasamy as Uncle of Ceylon Sundari
Manorama as Ceylon Sundari
Thiagarajan as Thiyagu
Y. G. Parthasarathy as Gopalakrishnan
Sathyaraj as a Gangster in Radha's Tea Stall
Silk Smitha as Roopa
Janagaraj as Chinnasamy
Y. G. Mahendra as Mahi
LIC Narasimhan as Hotel manager
Azhagu as a fighter (uncredited)

Production 
Cashing on the huge popularity of Bruce Lee and his martial arts films, S. P. Muthuraman and Panchu Arunachalam designed the story of a meek person who takes training in a martial arts school to avenge the death of his sister. Judo. K. K. Rathnam was the action choreographer, and the film was inspired by The 36th Chamber of Shaolin (1978). The production company AVM Productions initially wanted A. C. Tirulokchandar to play the antagonist, but he declined. Karate Mani, a stuntman was later cast in the role, but he walked out. The role finally went to Jaishankar.

Soundtrack 
The music was composed by Ilaiyaraaja and lyrics were written by Vaali. The disco song "Aadi Maasam" was well received, and it was later remixed by Srikanth Deva in Thottupaar (2010).

Release and reception 
Paayum Puli was released on 14 January 1983, Pongal day. Kalki said the real pouncing tigers of the film were the hero and the technicians. The makers wanted to release the film in Sri Lanka, but got into trouble as the title had "puli" (tiger), perceived as alluding to the Liberation Tigers of Tamil Eelam. It was decided to release the film in the country with the title Irumbu Karangal, but the film still did not release there.

References

Bibliography

External links 
 

1980s Tamil-language films
1983 films
1983 martial arts films
AVM Productions films
Films directed by S. P. Muthuraman
Films scored by Ilaiyaraaja
Films with screenplays by Panchu Arunachalam
Indian films about revenge
Indian martial arts films